The 2020 Summer Olympics were held in Japan from 23 July to 8 August 2021 after being postponed a year by the COVID-19 pandemic. In total, 2,402 medals were won by 2,175 athletes in 339 events at the Games.

{| id="toc" class="toc" summary="Contents"
|-
| style="text-align:center;" colspan=3|Contents
|- style="vertical-align:top;"
|
Archery
Artistic swimming
Athletics
Badminton
Baseball
Basketball
Boxing
Canoeing
Cycling
Diving
Equestrian
Fencing
Field hockey
|valign=top|
Football
Golf
Gymnastics
Handball
Judo
Karate
Modern pentathlon
Rowing
Rugby sevens
Sailing
Shooting
Skateboarding
|valign=top|
Softball
Sport climbing
Surfing
Swimming
Table tennis
Taekwondo
Tennis
Triathlon
Volleyball
Water polo
Weightlifting
Wrestling
|-
| colspan=3|

|}


Archery

Artistic swimming

Athletics

Men's events

Women's events

Mixed events

Badminton

Baseball

Basketball

Boxing

Men's events

Women's events

Canoeing

Slalom

Sprint

Men's events

Women's events

Cycling

Road cycling

Track cycling

Men's events

Women's events

Mountain biking

BMX

Diving

Men's events

Women's events

Equestrian

Fencing

Men's events

Women's events

Field hockey

Football

Golf

Gymnastics

Artistic gymnastics

Men's events

Women's events

Rhythmic gymnastics

Trampoline

Handball

Judo

Men's events

Women's events

Mixed events

Karate

Men's events

Women's events

Modern pentathlon

Rowing

Men's events

Women's events

Rugby sevens

Sailing

Men's events

Women's events

Mixed events

Shooting

Men's events

Women's events

Mixed events

Skateboarding

Sport climbing

Softball

Surfing

Swimming

Men's events

Women's events

Mixed events

Table tennis

Taekwondo

Men's events

Women's events

Tennis

Triathlon

Volleyball

Indoor volleyball

Beach volleyball

Water polo

Weightlifting

Men's events

Women's events

Wrestling

Men's freestyle

Men's Greco-Roman

Women's freestyle

Changes in medals
On 18 February 2022, British runner CJ Ujah was found to have tested positive for banned substances (ostarine and S-23). The British men's 4 × 100 metres relay silver medal was stripped, with Canada being promoted to silver and China taking bronze.

See also
 2020 Summer Olympics medal table

References

Lists of Summer Olympic medalists by year